Mikhail Eramchuk (born 14 November 1980 in Rechytsa) is a retired Belarusian professional footballer. As of 2015, he works as a head coach for Rechitsa-2014.

Honours
MTZ-RIPO Minsk
Belarusian Cup winner: 2004–05, 2007–08

Naftan Novopolotsk
Belarusian Cup winner: 2011–12

External links
 

1980 births
Living people
People from Rechytsa
Belarusian footballers
FC Rechitsa-2014 players
FC Gomel players
FC Partizan Minsk players
FC Belshina Bobruisk players
FC Naftan Novopolotsk players
Association football midfielders
Sportspeople from Gomel Region